A Lưới is a rural district of Thừa Thiên Huế province in the North Central Coast region of Vietnam. It is located west in the highly mountainous area of A Shau Valley bordering Laos. The population includes many Bru, Hoa and Tà Ôi people. As of 2003 the district had a population of 38,616. The district covers an area of 1,229 km² and its capital lies at A Lưới, a former French airfield, later used by the Americans in Operation Delaware and then by the North Vietnamese for courier flights.

Many areas and mountains in the A Luoi region became historically significant in the mid-late 1960s during the Vietnam War, such the Battle of A Shau, the 5th Special Forces' A Lưới Camp that was overrun in 1966, as well as the 4,878-foot Dong Re Lao Mountain best known as the "Signal Hill" that was seized by 1st Cavalry Division LRRP / Rangers in 1968 during Operation Delaware. Also, A Bia Mountain, known as the Hamburger Hill that was seized by members of the 101st Airborne Division.

A Lưới is connected to the former French colonial capital and coastal city, Huế, one of the main historical cities in central Vietnam by National Road 49, a road notorious for poor safety because of the mountainous terrain and poor road surface. The A Lưới district has one town and 21 communes. The central town has gas stations, and a few guest-houses for travelers.

Communes

Hồng Thủy
Hồng Vân
Hồng Trung
Hồng Kim
Hồng Nam
Hồng Hạ
Hồng Bắc
Bắc Sơn
Hồng Quảng
A Ngo
Sơn Thủy
Phú Vinh
Nhâm
Hồng Thái
Hồng Thượng
Hương Phong
Hương Lâm
Đông Sơn
A Đớt
A Roàng
Hương Nguyên

Get to A Luoi
There are many ways to get to A Luoi such as local bus at South Bus Station but it's a really local bus and not good one.
Beside you can also rent a private car to explore A Luoi for one or two days. You can connect to Hue city or Hoian Town as well. It could be the best chance to take photos of the minority people on a Vietnam Photo tour.

See also

Battle of A Shau
Battle of Signal Hill Vietnam
Dong Re Lao Mountain
Operation Delaware

References

Districts of Thừa Thiên Huế province